Louis Clinton Mosher (April 26, 1880 – September 29, 1958) was a Second Lieutenant in the United States Army and a Medal of Honor recipient for his actions in the Philippine–American War.

Medal of Honor citation
Rank and organization: Second Lieutenant, Philippine Scouts. Place and date: At Gagsak Mountain, Jolo, Philippine Islands, June 11, 1913. Entered service at: Brockton, Mass. Birth: Westport, Mass. Date of issue: Unknown.

Citation:

Voluntarily entered a cleared space within about 20 yards of the Moro trenches under a furious fire from them and carried a wounded soldier of his company to safety at the risk of his own life.

See also

List of Medal of Honor recipients
List of Philippine–American War Medal of Honor recipients

References

1958 deaths
United States Army Medal of Honor recipients
United States Army officers
People from Westport, Massachusetts
American military personnel of the Philippine–American War
1880 births
Philippine–American War recipients of the Medal of Honor
Burials at San Francisco National Cemetery
American expatriates in the Philippines
Military personnel from Massachusetts